Joan Rice (3 February 1930 – 1 January 1997) was an English film actress.

Rice is best known for her role as Dalabo in the film His Majesty O'Keefe (1954) which co-starred Burt Lancaster. Apart from that she played Maid Marian in The Story of Robin Hood and His Merrie Men (1952), played the graverobber's wife in The Horror of Frankenstein and appeared in Operation Bullshine. For several years in the early and mid-1950s, Rice was considered one of 'Rank's top stars'. She was loaned to Adelphi Films to make The Crowded Day.

She was reputedly discovered working as a waitress in a Lyons Corner House in London, where she was crowned "Miss Lyons, 1949"; and thereafter trained at the Rank Organisation's "charm school".

Her interment was at Braywick Cemetery in Maidenhead.

Filmography

References

External links

Joan Rice – More details at YouAndYesterday – https://web.archive.org/web/20080517042046/http://www.youandyesterday.co.uk/articles/Rice,_Joan_-_Maid_Marian_of_Abbey_Street

1930 births
1997 deaths
English film actresses
20th-century English actresses
People from Derby
Burials in Berkshire